Raykar dos Santos Campos (born 19 July 1997), commonly known as Raykar, is a Brazilian footballer who currently plays as a defender for Petrolina.

Career statistics

Club

Notes

References

1997 births
Living people
Brazilian footballers
Association football defenders
Sociedade Esportiva Decisão Futebol Clube players
Vera Cruz Futebol Clube players